Paul William Brosman (November 9, 1899 – December 21, 1955) was the 13th dean of the Tulane University Law School, serving from 1937 to 1951.  According to Edward F. Sherman, he "was on the first civilian Court of Military Appeals created by the UCMJ in 1951 and played a role in the 'civilianizing' of military justice procedures." He was born in Albion, Illinois, and died in Washington D.C.

He graduated in 1924 from the University of Illinois where he was president of Phi Kappa Tau fraternity.  He also attended Indiana University and Yale University.  He was an instructor in business law at Indiana University in the 1920s and later professor of law at Mercer University.  He came to Tulane in 1932 and became assistant dean in 1935 and dean in 1937.  He was an Army veteran of World War I and during World War II was chief of the Military Justice Division, Office of the Air Judge Advocate of the Air Force Headquarters.

References

Tulane University faculty
Tulane University Law School faculty
Deans of Tulane University Law School
1899 births
1955 deaths
People from Albion, Illinois
20th-century American academics